The ER – International Conference on Conceptual Modeling is an annual research conference computer science dedicated to information and conceptual modeling. Since the first event in 1979 in Los Angeles, California, USA, the conference has evolved into one of the major forums for research on conceptual modeling and information retrieval.

Conceptual modeling is about describing the semantics of software applications at a high level of abstraction. Specifically, conceptual modelers (1) describe structure models in terms of entities, relationships, and constraints; (2) describe behavior or functional models in terms of states, transitions among states, and actions performed in states and transitions; and (3) describe interactions and user interfaces in terms of messages sent and received and information exchanged. In their typical usage, conceptual-model diagrams are high-level abstractions that enable clients and analysts to understand one another, enable analysts to communicate successfully with application programmers, and in some cases automatically generate (parts of) the software application.

Topics 

Entity-relationship model
Entity-relationship diagram
Conceptual schema design
Model-driven software development
Model-driven architecture (MDA)
Unified Modeling Language (UML)
Extended or enhanced entity–relationship model
Object-role modeling
Process modeling
Business process modeling
Workflow Design
Foundational theory of conceptual models and conceptual modeling

Peter Chen Award

Initiated by Elsevier in 2008 to celebrate the 25th anniversary of the journal, Data and Knowledge Engineering, the Peter P. Chen Award honors one person each year for his or her outstanding contributions to the field of conceptual modeling. From 2009 to 2012, the winner received a plaque and check for $1000 by the ER Institute. Starting in 2013, the winner receives a check for $2500 donated by Elsevier. The award will be announced and presented at the ER Conference.
The selection process is done according to the following four criteria:
Research: how well the nominee has helped advance the field of conceptual modeling with his/her intellectual contributions.
Service: participation in the organization of conceptual-modeling-related meetings and conferences and participation in editorial boards of conceptual-modeling-related journals.
Education: how effectively the nominee has mentored doctoral students in conceptual modeling, produced researchers from their labs, and helped mentor other young people in the field.
Contribution to practice: the extent to which the nominee has contributed to technology transfer, commercialization, and industrial projects.
International reputation: the extent to which the nominee's work is visible to and has diffused into the international community.

Previous winners of the Peter P. Chen Award
 2014: Antônio Luz Furtado
 2013: Carlo Batini
 2012: Stefano Spaccapietra
 2011: Tok Wang Ling
 2010: John Mylopoulos
 2009: David W. Embley
 2008: Bernhard Thalheim

Locations 
Location history from DBLP:
 ER 2017: 36th International Conference, ER 2017, Valencia, Spain, November 6–9, 2017
 ER 2016: 35th International Conference on Conceptual Modeling, Gifu, Japan, Nov. 14-17, 2016
 33rd International Conference, ER 2014, Atlanta, GA, USA, October 27–29, 2014
 ER 2013: Hong Kong, P.R. China
 ER 2012: Florence, Italy
 ER 2011: Brussels, Belgium
 ER 2010: Vancouver, Canada
 ER 2009: Gramado, Brazil
 ER 2008: Barcelona, Spain
 ER 2007: Auckland, New Zealand
 ER 2006: Tucson, Arizona, USA
 ER 2005: Klagenfurt, Austria
 ER 2004: Shanghai, China
 ER 2003: Chicago, Illinois, USA
 ER 2002: Tampere, Finland
 ER 2001: Yokohama, Japan
 ER 2000: Salt Lake City, Utah, USA
 ER 1999: Paris, France
 ER 1998: Singapore
 ER 1997: Los Angeles, California, USA
 ER 1996: Cottbus, Germany
 ER 1995: Gold Coast, Australia
 ER 1994: Manchester, UK
 ER 1993: Arlington, Texas, USA
 ER 1992: Karlsruhe, Germany
 ER 1991: San Mateo, California, USA
 ER 1990: Lausanne, Switzerland
 ER 1989: Toronto, Canada
 ER 1988: Rome, Italy
 ER 1987: New York, USA:
 ER 1986: Dijon, France
 ER 1985: Chicago, Illinois, USA
 ER 1983: Anaheim, California, USA
 ER 1981: Washington, DC, USA
 ER 1979: Los Angeles, California, USA

References

Further reading
 1976. "The Entity-Relationship Model—Toward a Unified View of Data". In: ACM Transactions on Database Systems 1/1/1976 ACM-Press ISSN 0362-5915, S. 9–36
 2002. "Entity-Relationship Modeling—Historical Events, Future Trends, and Lessons Learned". In: Software Pioneers: Contributions to Software Engineering. Broy M. and Denert, E. (eds.), Springer-Verlag, Berlin, Lecturing Notes in Computer Sciences, June 2002, pp. 100–114.

External links 
 The history of conceptual modeling 
 Bibliography at DBLP

International conferences
Conceptual modelling